Paddy John (born 23 February 1990) is a Dutch professional footballer who plays as a forward.

Early and personal life
John was born in Zwedru, Liberia and grew up in the Netherlands. His two brothers Collins and Ola are also footballers.

Career
John began his career with the youth team of Twente, and began his professional career in the 2008-09 season with Heracles Almelo. He later played for RKC Waalwijk and Fortuna Sittard, before signing for German Club VfL Osnabrück in July 2011. After one season he returned to the Netherlands and signed with AGOVV Apeldoorn.

John signed for GVVV in August 2016. He made one appearance in the Tweede Divisie as a substitute against Jong Sparta before leaving the club in January 2017.

References

External links

1990 births
Living people
People from Grand Gedeh County
Dutch people of Liberian descent
Sportspeople of Liberian descent
Liberian emigrants to the Netherlands
Dutch footballers
Association football forwards
Eredivisie players
Eerste Divisie players
Tweede Divisie players
3. Liga players
Heracles Almelo players
RKC Waalwijk players
Fortuna Sittard players
VfL Osnabrück players
Dutch expatriate footballers
Dutch expatriate sportspeople in Germany
Expatriate footballers in Germany
GVVV players